Akhchadepe is a town in southern Turkmenistan about  from the border with Iran. It is located in Ahal Province.

Nearby settlements include Imeni Stalina, Mane, Cace, Chahchaheh and Cheshmeh Shur.
Populated places in Ahal Region